David Mathayo David (born 24 July 1969) is a Tanzanian CCM politician and Member of Parliament for Same West constituency since 2005. He is the current Minister of Livestock and Fisheries Development.

Background
Mathayo (formerly known as David Msuya) graduated from Sokoine University in Morogoro with a Bachelor of Veterinary Medicine in 1997. He is known to have emigrated to Botswana to teach at an agricultural college in Serowe. While in Botswana he "won" an election as an MP of West Same constituent back in Tanzania and got picked to be a deputy minister in Trade and Industry. He is currently serving as the deputy minister for agriculture.

Mathayo was one of the youngest MPs to be into a ministerial post. His selection was the epitome of president Kikwete's new leadership style which disregarded age as a factor and valued education and talent. Mathayo's qualifications have been a subject of debate in the public since his selection into his current ministerial position. Many wonder how he managed to achieve all his postgraduate qualifications in 5 years while working on a full-time basis in Botswana. According to his on-line CV1, he graduated in Sokoine (BVM) in 1997 (this qualification as a vet doctor is undisputed). From here he went to teach at a college in Serowe Botswana where he also got his M.Sc (1998–2001, then he got his Pg.Dip (2000–2001), then his Ph.D in Agriculture (2001–2003). Many people who know Mathayo personally including his Sokoine University lecturers believe that his postgraduate qualifications, especially the Ph.D, are unlikely to be genuine. Recently the Tanzania Commission for Universities (TCU) wrote a letter that they had verified the authenticity of Dr Mathayo's certificates.2 However, the question still remains whether the TCU verified the certificates or the actual studies and qualifications of Mathayo.3

Education chronology
Marindi Primary School (1978–1984)
Galanos Secondary School (1985–1988)
Tosamaganga Secondary School (1989–1991)
National Service (1991–1992)
Sokoine University of Agriculture (1992–1997)
India Postgraduate diploma (public administration) (1998–1999)
University of Pretoria Masters of Science (1998 2001)
Ambala University (PgDip International relations) (2000–2001)
Free State University (PhD Agriculture) (2001–2003)

Work chronology
Teacher at Serowe College Botswana (1998–2001)(full-time)
Teacher at Associated college of University of Botswana (2001–2003) ?This is the same as Serowe college?

Politics
CCM Member of National Executive Council (1997–2002) While out of the country serving another government
CCM Member of Parliament of Tanzania (2005–2010)

References

1969 births
Living people
Chama Cha Mapinduzi MPs
Tanzanian MPs 2005–2010
Tanzanian MPs 2010–2015
Government ministers of Tanzania
Galanos Secondary School alumni
Tosamaganga Secondary School alumni
Sokoine University of Agriculture alumni
University of Pretoria alumni
University of the Free State alumni